Terzi is a surname.  People with this surname include:

Al Terzi, news anchor 
Aleardo Terzi (1870–1943), Italian illustrator and poster artist
Amedeo John Engel Terzi (1872–1956), Italian scientific illustrator and entomologist
Andrea Terzi (1842–1918), Italian painter and engraver
Antonia Terzi (born 1971), Italian aerodynamicist
Claudio Terzi, (born 1984), Italian footballer
Cristoforo Terzi (1692–1743), Italian painter
Filippo Terzi (1520–1597), Italian military and civil architect and engineer  
Francesco Terzi (c. 1525–1600), Italian painter
Francesco Lana de Terzi, SJ (c. 1631–1687) Italian Jesuit and aeronautics pioneer
Gianna Terzi or Yianna Terzi (born 1980), Greek singer and songwriter
Giulia Terzi (born 1995), Italian swimmer
Giulio Terzi di Sant'Agata (born 1946), Italian diplomat and politician
Ludwig, Baron von Terzi (1740–1800), Austrian general
Margherita Terzi, Venetian pastellist of the eighteenth century
Mehmet Terzi, (born 1955), Turkish marathon runner
Orhan Terzi (born  1965), known as DJ Quicksilver, Turkish-born German DJ and music producer
Semih Terzi (? – 15 July 2016), officer in the Turkish Army, shot dead during the 2016 Turkish coup d'état attempt 
Zuhdi Labib Terzi (née Zuhdi Labib Suleiman Tarazi; 1924–2006), the first Palestinian Ambassador to the United Nations

See also
Terzis

Italian-language surnames
Turkish-language surnames